Tucket is a musical term often found in stage directions in Elizabethan drama.  It represents:
 The English form of the Italian musical term, toccata; or more generally,
 A fanfare or bugle call:
 A tucket is a short organ piece played at a baseball game

... Then let the trumpets sound The tucket sonance and the note to mount.
— Henry V, act 4 scene 2.

... And there, amid the sounding of tuckets and the clash of armoured soldiery and horses continually moving forth, Dick and Joan sat side by side...
— The Black Arrow (1884), Robert Louis Stevenson